The Battle of Thompson's Station was a battle of the American Civil War, occurring on March 5, 1863 in Williamson County, Tennessee.

In a period of relative inactivity following the Battle of Stones River, a reinforced Union infantry brigade, under Col. John Coburn, left Franklin to reconnoiter south toward Columbia. Four miles from Spring Hill, Coburn attacked with his right wing, a Confederate Army force composed of two regiments; he was repelled. Then, Maj. Gen. Earl Van Dorn seized the initiative. Brig. Gen. W.H. "Red" Jackson's dismounted 2nd Division made a frontal attack, while Brig. Gen. Nathan Bedford Forrest's division swept around Coburn's left flank, and into his rear. After three attempts, characterized by hard fighting, Jackson carried the Union hilltop position as Forrest captured Coburn's wagon train and blocked the road to Nashville in his rear. Out of ammunition and surrounded, Coburn surrendered, along with all but two of his field officers. Union influence in Middle Tennessee subsided for a while.

Union units involved included 19th Michigan Infantry Regiment (20 killed, 92 wounded, 345 captured, total 457) and 33rd Indiana Infantry Regiment (13 killed, 85 wounded, 407 captured, total 505).

Van Dorn and Forrest received help with their victory from an unlikely participant. Miss Alice Thompson, age 17 at the time, was sheltering in the basement of the residence of Lieutenant Banks. The 3rd Arkansas Cavalry Regiment was advancing through the yard, lost their Colonel (Samuel G. Earle) and their color bearer, and the regiment was thrown into disorder. Miss Alice Thompson rushed out, raised the flag and led the regiment to victory. The enemy lauded her action.

References

External links

 National Park Service battle description
 CWSAC Report Update

Battles of the Middle Tennessee Operations of the American Civil War
Battles of the Western Theater of the American Civil War
Battles of the American Civil War in Tennessee
Williamson County, Tennessee
Confederate victories of the American Civil War
Conflicts in 1863
1863 in Tennessee
March 1863 events